Đỗ Nguyễn Mai Khôi (born 1982), known professionally as Mai Khoi, is a Vietnamese singer, artist, and political activist. Described as the "Lady Gaga of Vietnam" and also compared to Russian artist-activists Pussy Riot, she began as an award-winning pop singer before her outspoken criticism of the Government of Vietnam's censorship and lack of democracy led to government persecution and restrictions on her freedom of speech. Khôi has also criticised Google and Facebook for cooperating with internet censorship in Vietnam. In 2018 she received the Václav Havel Prize for Creative Dissent in recognition of her democracy activism.

Early life and education
Đỗ Nguyễn Mai Khôi was born in 1982 in Cam Ranh, Vietnam.

Khôi's interest in music began in childhood, learning guitar from her music teacher father at 8 years old and playing with him at weddings from the age of 12. She later attended a music school in Ho Chi Minh City for three years but left without graduating, instead playing in pubs and bars around the city.

Musical career

In 2010, Khôi achieved national fame after winning the Vietnam Television 2010 Album of the Year Award, using her national platform to agitate for better women's rights and LGBT rights in her country. For example, she spoke against Đàm Vĩnh Hưng's suggestion that domestic violence was "acceptable" against women who were "too aggressive", and criticised social acceptance of violence against women.

Khôi attracted controversy for shaving half of her head into the letters "VN" to represent "Vietnam" after her winning song of the same name. She was criticised in Vietnamese state media for her expressed preference not to have children as well as her boundary-pushing outfits and songs such as "Selfie Orgasm", which garnered criticism for nudity and coarse language in the music video. After she began arguing in favour of greater creative freedom and stopped submitting her song lyrics to censors, the Vietnamese government banned her performances in the country, with police raiding her concerts.

Khôi has toured overseas, including in the United States, Australia, Europe, Mexico, and Cuba.

Following government crackdown on her music career, Khôi moved her music underground, calling her new group "Mai Khoi and the Dissidents."

In exile in Pittsburgh, USA, Khôi is currently working on a project titled "Bad Activist", an autobiographical piece combining storytelling and performance.

Political activism

In 2016, Khôi took part in environmental protests against Formosa Ha Tinh Steel Corporation following the marine life disaster caused by its waste dumping. She also applied to run as an independent for a seat in the National Assembly of Vietnam, but was disqualified from participating by the Vietnamese Fatherland Front. Following her attempt to enter politics, she was subject to increased official persecution, including police raids of her concerts and landlords being pressured by authorities to evict her and her husband from their home. After 2017, she leased a flat under a friend's name in a secret location in Hanoi.

She has also criticised Facebook for cooperating with internet censorship requirements imposed by the Vietnamese Government, stating it was damaging one of the last refuges for freedom of expression in the repressive state. It also prevented her live-streaming music due to the risk of instant arrest.

She was one of the political dissidents that U.S. President Barack Obama met with on his visit to the country in 2016. She had gone into hiding before the meeting to avoid being detained and prevented from attending the meeting. The following day she was visited by four policemen who intimidated her.

When Obama's successor Donald Trump visited the country in 2017, Khôi held up a banner reading "PeacePiss on you Trump" in protest of Trump's alleged racism and supposed failure to promote human rights. The following day, she and her husband were evicted from their Hanoi apartment following a visit by government agents.

In 2018, Amnesty International named Khôi as one of the "12 inspiring human rights activists to follow" for that year. Later that year, she was detained for eight hours at Nội Bài International Airport in Hanoi after returning from a European tour, with all copies of her new album Dissent in her possession confiscated by the authorities.

Personal life
Khôi married her Australian partner, Benjamin Swanton, in 2013.

They lived in Hanoi until she fled to the U.S. to escape prosecution, in November 2020 becoming a scholar in residence at the University of Pittsburgh's Scholars at Risk program on an Artist Protection Fund fellowship. Khôi lives in a residence provided by the Pittsburgh-based nonprofit City of Asylum and serves on the International Advisory Board of the International Free Expression Project, another Pittsburgh-based nonprofit. These two nonprofits also co-sponsored Khôi for an Artist Protection Fund fellowship in residence at the University of Pittsburgh which she is currently participating in.

Discography
Solo
 Mai-Khoi (2004)
 Mai-Khoi Sings Quoc-Bao (2008)
 Mot Ngay Moi (2010)
 Hay Hoa Hong (2010)
 Made in Mai Khoi (2010)
 Hat Le Cat Trong Ly (2010)
 Hoa Dal (2010)
 Mai Khoi Hay Hoa Hong (2011)
 Mot Ngay Moi (2011)
 Căn nhà nhỏ (2018)
 Khôi (2018)

Mai Khoi and the Dissidents / Mai Khôi Chem Gio
 Dissent (2018)

References

External links

 

Vietnamese contemporary artists
Vietnamese democracy activists
Vietnamese LGBT rights activists
Vietnamese human rights activists
21st-century Vietnamese women singers
Vietnamese exiles
Living people
1982 births